Toji, the Land (Korean: 토지; RR: Toji)  is a 2004 South Korean television series based on the novel Toji ( 토지) written by  Park Kyong-ni. The series following the story of turbulent life of Choi Seo-hee as she lives throughout the Donghak Peasant Revolution, the Eulmi Incident, the Japanese colonial era, and Korea's independence in 1945. As in the novel, the drama portrays the conflicts between individuals who are engulfed in their own desires of love and veiled enmity, rage and jealousy. Starring Kim Hyun-joo, Yoo Jun-sang, it premiered on SBS on November 26, 2004, and aired on Friday and Saturday at time-slot 20:45-21:45 (KST) till May 22, 2005.

Plot

When she was 5 years old, Seo Hee(Kim Hyun-joo)'s mother left with one of the servants, leaving her behind her father, who had never treated her well. The first shock was a preparation for her hardship. After her father was killed, her relative Joon Goo, taking advantage of her young age to gain possession of the land she rightfully owns. In these miserable years, her low status friend, Kim Gil-sang (Yoo Jun-sang) became her only support. He helped Seo Hee to run away from hometown to escape Joon Goo's plot forced Seo Hee to marry a disabled man. Then, she slowly builds her property as a merchant, driven by a desire to revenge Joon Goo and the ultimate goal is to regain the land.

Cast

Main 

 Bae Na-yeon → Shin Se-kyung → Kim Hyun-joo as Choi Seo-hee
 The baby of Champan Choi. He loses his father, Chi-soo Choi, and also loses his grandmother, the wife of Yun, who is a fanatic. His family is taken away by his greedy relative, Jo Jun-gu, but he gets up again.
 Seo Ji-won → Kim Ji-hoon → Yoo Jun-sang : Kim Gil-sang
 Champan Choi's servant. After marrying her owner, Agi Seo-hee, she gives birth to two sons, but commits to conflict and the independence movement.
 Kim Han-bi → Ham Eun-jeong → Lee Jae-eun as Bong-soon/Ki-hwa
 Seohee's body type. When Seohee and her party leave for Gando, they don't go and become gisaengs. She gives birth to a daughter, Yang-hyeon, with Sang-hyeon, but meets a tragic death.
 Jeong Se-in → Jung Chan : Lee Sang-hyun
 The eldest son of Ibusa (Lee Dong-jin). Seo-hee's fiancée. It hurts that Seo-hee chose Lucky-sang rather than herself. Later, he lives with Bong-sun.
 Kim Hoon-gi → Hae-jin Hae : Kim Pyeong-san/Kim Doo-su (Kim Geo-bok) (2 roles per person)
 The son of the fallen nobleman Kim Pyong-san. He becomes a pawn for the Japanese Empire and tries to take revenge on Seo-hee according to his father's will.

People of Choi Cham-pan 

 Kim Mi-sook as Yoon's wife - Seo-hee's spiritual support and grandmother. dies as a heatwave
 Park Ji-il as Choi Chi-soo - Choi Cham-pan; Seo-hee's father. cold personality. On the eve of Lunar New Year's Day, he is strangled by Kim Pyong-san.
 Kim Yu-seok as Kim Hwan/Gucheon - The illegitimate child born to Yun's wife and Kim Gae-joo. Seo Hee falls in love with a woman byeoldang and runs away.
 Lee Min-young : Byeol-dang Missi - Seo-hee's biological mother. He falls in love with Kim Hwan and runs away.
 Kim Gap-soo as Jo Jun-goo - Chi- soo 's cousin. Seo-hee's greedy relative
 Do Ji-won as Hong's wife - Jo Jun-goo's wife
 Joan : The role of a ghost girl - Choi Cham-pan's servant. ambitious
 Park Hye-sook as Bong-sun-ne - Bong-soon-mo. Champan Choi's mother-in-law
 Kim Young-ok : Gannan Grandmother - Choi Cham-pan's servant. A person who knows that Kim Hwan is the son of Yun's wife.
 Baek Seung-woo → Son Chang-joon as Jo Byeong-soo - Jo Jun-goo's son. Unlike his father, he is docile.
 Lee Won-jong as Kim Seo- bang - Gae Dung
 Kim Ji-young as Kim Seobang-daek - Gae-dong-mo
 Hwang Bo-ra as Yeon-i - Cham-pan Choi's servant
 Park Young-seo as Gae-dong - Kim Seo -bang's son and his wife
 Baeminhui : March Station
 Choi Seong-ho as Sam- su
 Baek Seung-wook: Doli

Pyeongsari people 

 Park Sang-won as Lee Yong - Farmer Pyeongsari
 Kim Yeo- jin as Kang Cheong-daek - Lee Yong-eun's home
 Park Ji-young as Im In-ne - Lee Yong- eun 's second wife. The original wife of Chil-Sung Lee; Im and 2nd son, Hongmo Lee
 Kim Hye-sun as Gong Wol- seon - the daughter of a shaman; first love of use
 Yang Geum- seok as Haman-daek - Kim Pyung-san's wife. Kim Doo-soo (Geobok) and Hanbok Mo. He committed suicide on the 16th day of February in the lunar calendar in 1895.
 Jeong Jong-jun as Kang Po-su - hunter. Kang Doo-me's (sheep) father
 Bae Do-hwan as Chil-seong Lee - Pyeongsa-ri, a greedy farmer; The original husband of Im In-ne, the biological father of Im and the second son.
 Lee Won-jae as Kim I-pyung
 Jung Kyung-soon as the youngest daughter - Pyeong-sari's widow
 Park Yong-soo as Kim Young-pal
 Lee Soon-jae as Kim Hoon-jang
 Choi Gyu- hwan as Kim Doo-man - Duman-ne's son
 Won Jang- hee → Kwon Jae-hwan as Kim Han-bok, Kim Doo-su's younger brother. Unlike his older brother who became a pawn for Japanese imperialism, he goes on the path of an independence activist.

People of Seohee's house 

 Won Deok-hyeon → Oh Tae-kyung as Choi Yoon-guk
 Seo-hee's second son. Tokyo student.
 Kim Ye-won → Jang Hee-jin as Lee Yang-hyeon
 Seo-hee's adopted daughter. Daughter of Bong-soon and Sang-hyeon.
 Kim Seung-wook → Kim Seok → Lee Joo-seok as Choi Hwan-guk
 Seohee's eldest son. He breaks Seo-hee's hopes of becoming a judge and becomes a painter.
 Park Mi-young as Hwang Deok-hee
 concubine of the country. the prince's daughter.
 Shin Sung-woon as Butler Jang Yeon-hak
 Kim So-hyun as Sae-chim

Independence activists 

 Park Si-eun as Yoo In-sil
 Kim Ji-wan as Jiro Ogada
 Park Jin-hyung as Jeong-seok

People from Immyeong-hee's side 

 Jung Ha-na as Im Im-myeong-hee
 Lee Chang as Jo Chan-ha
 Kim Il-woo as Jo Yong-ha
 Kim Mi-ra as Cho Chan-ha's wife Noriko
 Kim Hee-jun as Im Immyeong-bin

Yongjeong 

 Oh Yoon-hong as Ok-ne
 Kwon Soo-hyun as Ok-i
 Lee Jung-gil as Gong No-myeon
 Kim Seon-young as Bang's wife
 Yeom Hyeon-hee as Gong Song-ae
 Ha Da-som as Shim Geum-nyeo - Kim Doo-soo's only love.

Others 

 Go Joo - won as Song Young-gwang, Baek-jeong's son, Song Kwan-soo. He is dismissed because he is the son of a butcher.
 Ahn Joo-hee as Kang Hye-sook - Song Young-kwang's former lover
 Oh Seung-yoon → Jung-wook : Lee Hong
 Son of Lee Yong and Im Ine
 Lee Kyung-wha as Heo Bo-yeon - Lee Hong's wife
 Lee Eon- jeong as Yeom-jang - Lee Hong's first love
 Jeon Hyun-ah as Lee Im - The eldest daughter of Im In-ne and Lee Chil-sung. Lee Hong's father is another older sister
 Lee Young-ah as Lee Sang-sang - Lee Hong's daughter
 Park Sang-gyu : Lee Dong-jin as Lee Busa; Lee Sang-hyun's father independence activist
 Park Jin-seong as Song Gwan-soo - Baek-jeong, Song Young-kwang's father
 Kwak Jung-wook as Kang Do-me, Kang Po-su's (sheep) son. Ambition, the birth parents of the noble daughter and Lee Chil-sung's seed
 Lee Seung-hyung as Hwang Tae-soo - Seo-hee's son-in-law; Father of the eldest daughter-in-law Hwang Deok-hee
 Im Seo-yeon : Doo- ri
 Bae Min-hee as Sam-wol - Choi Cham-pan's servant, Jo Jun-goo, rapes him.
 Minwook
 Shin Goo  : Rep. Moon
 Lee Seung-cheol  as Kim Gae-joo - Donghak Ju-ju (real model Kim Gae-nam)
 Lim Il-gyu  as Kang Doo-me
 Oarang  : San Jose Station
 Lee Tae-hoon  as Monk Woo Gwan
 Dongjae Yang
 Maeng Horim
 Kiseon Kwon
 Kwon Kyung-ha
 Kwon  Bok- soon : I'm out again.
 Noh Movie  : Wolseonne
 Kim Shin-rok  : Hanbok's wife
 Kim  Hwa-ran: Pansulne
 Jong-Hoon Jeong  : Master Hye- Kwan
 Kim Hak-yong  : Pouch
 Jo  Jung- guk : Yong-chil
 Kim Soon-yi  : Two people .
 Park Yoon-jung  : Fortune-telling

Production

Casting
In 2003, SBS confirmed Kim Hyun-joo was chosen as the main role of Choi Seo-hee

Development
In October 2003, the drama started filming in Hadong.

The production cost 15 billion won. New setting for the drama were built in Hadong, South Gyeongsang Province and Hoengseong, Gangwon Province, South Korea. In Hadong, about 40 houses were built centered on Choi Champandaek, which now become a tourist attraction. And about 80 houses were built in Hoengseong, which contains realistic scenes of Yongjeong, Hoeryong and Jinju, as well as Harbin, China and Japan during the Japanese colonial period.

Note 
This 2004 version drama was the first drama produced after the novel Toji was completed, has been evaluated to have fully captured the thoughts and thoughts of writer Park Kyongni.

Broadcasting changes and extension 
 The broadcast of episode scheduled on December 19, 2004, was cancelled due to the friendly football match Korea vs Germany.

Awards and nominations

External links

References

Seoul Broadcasting System television dramas
2004 South Korean television series debuts
2005 South Korean television series endings
Korean-language television shows
Television shows set in South Gyeongsang Province